Winningkoff is a former unincorporated community in Collin County, located in the U.S. state of Texas. It has been annexed by the city of Lucas.

References

Unincorporated communities in Collin County, Texas
Unincorporated communities in Texas